Tom MacKay Creek Cone is a basalt subglacial mound in northwestern British Columbia, Canada. It is part of the Iskut-Unuk River Cones group and last erupted during the Pleistocene epoch.

See also
List of volcanoes in Canada
List of Northern Cordilleran volcanoes
Volcanism of Canada
Volcanism of Western Canada

References

Volcanoes of British Columbia
Mountains of British Columbia
Subglacial mounds of Canada
Pleistocene volcanoes